Adventures in Freestyle is the fourth album by the British electronic music group Freestylers, released on 2 October 2006.

The album contains the track "Painkiller", which has been released as a single before the album, and it features Pendulum, with whom they had already collaborated with on the track "Fasten Your Seatbelt" from their album Hold Your Colour.

Track listing

Track 2 is a cover of "Security" by the Beat Club.
Track 3 is a remix of "Feeling the Love" by Reactor.
Track 5 samples "To Cut a Long Story Short" by Spandau Ballet.

References

Freestylers albums
2006 albums